Rangoli Metro Art Center was developed by the Bangalore Metro Rail Corporation Ltd (BMRCL), after the construction work of the MG Road metro station, Bangalore was completed. It was inaugurated on 6 May 2013.

BMRCL redesigned the walkway with bougainvillea, as was available for the public before the construction of the metro rail station. The center includes art galleries, auditorium, play area for kids, and a walkway.

Facilities
 Nagara Pete (Market)
 Art Galleries: Vismaya, Chaya and Belaku
 Auditorium: Rangasthala
 Children's interactive play area: Chilipili
 Upper Walk-way: Hoovina Haadi
 Open area for outdoor performances: Bayalu
 Friendship Point
 Info Wall: Bangalore over the years
 Green Initiation
 Outdoor spaces for artistic activities, such as workshops and demonstrations

Events 
In May 2017, a tribute to artist Yusuf Arakkal was showcased.

On 1 May 2022, the Embassy of France organised Bonjour India's City for All? aimed at making public spaces in Indian cities more accessible to women and transgender people by engaging the masses in public art projects.

External links
 Rangoli website at BMRC

References

Namma Metro